Andrew Courtice (born 30 March 1961) is an Australian cricketer. He played in 49 first-class and 16 List A matches for Queensland between 1982 and 1988.

See also
 List of Queensland first-class cricketers

References

External links
 

1961 births
Living people
Australian cricketers
Queensland cricketers
Cricketers from Brisbane